Sit Down Young Stranger is Canadian singer Gordon Lightfoot's fifth studio album and his best-selling original album. Shortly after its 1970 release on the Reprise Records label, it was renamed If You Could Read My Mind when the song of that title reached #1 on the RPM Top Singles chart in Canada and #5 on the Billboard Hot 100 in the US. The album itself reached #12 on the Billboard 200 chart. In Canada, the album was on the charts from April 18, 1970, to November 27, 1971. It peaked at #8 on March 13, 1971 after an earlier peak at #12 on June 20, 1970.  Its last 24 weeks were spent in the 90s, except for appearances at #88 and #100.

History
Sit Down Young Stranger was Lightfoot's first recording for his new label, Reprise Records. He had left United Artists because he believed they did not adequately promote his albums.

On this album, Lightfoot included more orchestration, which is particularly evident on "If You Could Read My Mind". It was also the first studio album to feature long-time Lightfoot bassist Rick Haynes. The orchestration on "Minstrel of the Dawn" and "Approaching Lavender" was arranged by Randy Newman.

The album contained one of the first recorded versions of Kris Kristofferson and Fred Foster's "Me and Bobby McGee" which had previously been a country hit for Roger Miller and would later become a hit for Janis Joplin.

A small number of vinyl copies of the album contain no title on the front cover. This is because the cover was originally supposed to be just a picture of Lightfoot, but it was then thought that stating the title would increase the album's sales. The untitled copies did have a small sticker on the cellophane wrap bearing the album's title.

One rarity of note is "The Pony Man" appears on the Warner Brothers loss leader Schlagers! without the harmonica overdub.

Reception

In his retrospective Allmusic review, critic Jim Newsom praised the album, writing "While future albums would begin to drift away from the folky acoustic timbres of this one, the beauty and simplicity of Sit Down Young Stranger make it a timeless recording."

Track listing
All compositions by Gordon Lightfoot; except where indicated

Side 1
"Minstrel of the Dawn" – 3:26
"Me and Bobby McGee" (Kris Kristofferson, Fred Foster) - 3:38
"Approaching Lavender" – 2:56
"Saturday Clothes" – 3:20
"Cobwebs & Dust" – 3:20
"Poor Little Allison" – 2:30

Side 2
"Sit Down Young Stranger" – 3:26
"If You Could Read My Mind" – 3:48
"Baby It's Alright" – 2:58
"Your Love's Return (Song for Stephen Foster)" – 3:55
"The Pony Man" – 3:27

Chart performance

Certifications

Personnel
 Gordon Lightfoot - guitar, piano, vocals
Red Shea - guitar
 Rick Haynes - bass
with:
 Ry Cooder - slide guitar on "Me and Bobby McGee", mandolin on "Cobwebs and Dust"
 Van Dyke Parks - harmonium on "Cobwebs and Dust"
 John Sebastian - electric guitar on "Baby It's Alright", autoharp on "Saturday Clothes", harmonica on "The Pony Man"
 Nick DeCaro - string arrangements on "Poor Little Allison", "If You Could Read My Mind" and "Your Love's Return"
 Randy Newman - string arrangement on "Minstrel of the Dawn" and "Approaching Lavender"
 Kris Kristofferson was rumored to have provided harmony vocals on "Me and Bobby McGee"
Technical
Gary Brandt, Lee Herschberg - engineer
Barry Feinstein, Tom Wilkes - design, photography

References

External links
Album lyrics and chords
 

Gordon Lightfoot albums
1970 albums
Reprise Records albums
Albums arranged by Randy Newman
Albums produced by Joe Wissert
Albums produced by Lenny Waronker
Albums conducted by Randy Newman